The Fürstenwalde Solar Park is a photovoltaic power station in Fürstenwalde, Germany. It has a capacity of 39.64 megawatt (MW) and an annual output of 36.5 GWh. The solar park was developed by the company Solarhybrid and built by conecon using 62,832 225-watt and 110,880 230-watt solar panels, both manufactured by Suntech.

See also

List of photovoltaic power stations

References

Photovoltaic power stations in Germany